The 1992–93 season was Atlético Madrid's 62nd season since foundation in 1903 and the club's 58th season in La Liga, the top league of Spanish football. Atlético competed in La Liga, the Supercopa de España, the Copa del Rey, and the European Cup Winners' Cup.

Squad

Transfers

In

Out

Results

La Liga

League table

Position by round

Matches

Supercopa de España

Copa del Rey

European Cup Winners' Cup

Squad statistics

Appearances and goals

|-
! colspan=13 style=background:#DCDCDC; text-align:center| 

|-
! colspan=13 style=background:#DCDCDC; text-align:center|

References

External links

Official website

Atlético Madrid seasons
Atlético Madrid